The Secret of Polichinelle (French:Le secret de Polichinelle) is a 1923 French silent comedy film directed by René Hervil and starring Andrée Brabant, Gabriel Signoret and Maurice de Féraudy. It is based on a play by Pierre Wolff, and was remade as a sound film in 1936.

Cast
 Andrée Brabant as Marie - la compagne  
 Gabriel Signoret as Le docteur Trévoux 
 Maurice de Féraudy as Monsieur Jouvenel - le père  
 Jeanne Cheirel as Madame Jouvenel - la mère  
 Catherine Fonteney 
 Jean Dehelly as Henri Jouvenel - le fils  
 Sigrist as L'enfant  
 Carrel 
 Émile Garandet as Le majordome

References

Bibliography
 Maurice Bessy & Raymond Chirat. Histoire du cinéma français: 1935-1939. Pygmalion, 1987.

External links
 

1923 films
1920s French-language films
French silent feature films
Films directed by René Hervil
French films based on plays
French black-and-white films
French comedy films
1923 comedy films
Silent comedy films
1920s French films